The Clive Cheesman Nature Reserve is a protected area of riverine forest and grassland in the suburb of Kloof, Durban, South Africa.

References 

Nature reserves in South Africa